Regent Albany can refer to several Dukes of Albany who served as regent of the Kingdom of Scotland:

Robert Stewart, Duke of Albany (c.1340 – 1420)
Murdoch Stewart, Duke of Albany (1362–1425)
John Stewart, 2nd Duke of Albany (1481–1536)